Bernardo Barrondo (born 5 June 1993) is a Guatemalan racewalking athlete. He qualified to represent Guatemala at the 2020 Summer Olympics in Tokyo 2021, competing in men's 50 kilometres walk.

References

External links
 

 

1993 births
Living people
Guatemalan male racewalkers
Athletes (track and field) at the 2020 Summer Olympics
Olympic athletes of Guatemala
20th-century Guatemalan people
21st-century Guatemalan people